Quartly is a surname. Notable people with the surname include:

 Reg Quartly (1912–1983), British-born Australian comedian
 Rob Quartly, Canadian music video, television, and commercial director